Veitvet is a station on Grorud Line (Line 5) on the Oslo Metro. It is located at Veitvet between Linderud and Rødtvet,  from Stortinget. It was opened on 16 October 1966. Like much of the eastern subway network, the station is located in a largely residential area with apartment buildings. The station is located just north of the Veitvet Shopping Centre.

References

External links

Oslo Metro stations in Oslo
Railway stations opened in 1966
1966 establishments in Norway